Kwali is a local government area in the Federal Capital Territory in Nigeria.

It has an area of 1,206 km and a population of 85,837 at the 2006 census.

The postal code of the area is 904105.

History 
Kwali was created on October 1, 1996 by the military administration of General Sani Abacha.

Socio-Cultural Life 
One profession that the people of Kwali Local Government Area are famous for is pottery. Indeed, it is the country home of the world-famous potter woman, Dr. Ladi Kwali whose image currently adorns the 20 Naira bill. Another is cloth making. But today, other professions such as farming, hunting and trading are also practiced by the inhabitants of Kwali Area Council.

Constitution 
Like other area councils in Nigeria, Kwali is headed by an elected chairman and is sub-divided into wards. The 10 wards that make up Kwali Area Council are Ashara, Dafa, Gumbo, Kilankwa, Kundu, Kwali, Pai, Wako, Yangoji and Yebu. Each Ward is headed by a councillor. But unlike a typical area council in Nigeria, Kwali has a different mode of sub-division into districts headed by district heads.

Important Monuments 

Kwali Area Council plays host to a number of important monuments including Federal Government College National Mathematical Center Sheda Kwali, Sheda Science and technology complex, Nigeria Education Research and Development Center, National Fire Academy Sheda[19], Nigeria National Petroleum Corporation (NNPC) pump station Awawa and more.

References

External links

 Official Website

Local Government Areas in the Federal Capital Territory (Nigeria)
Populated places in the Federal Capital Territory (Nigeria)